L'abito nero da sposa is a 1945 Italian historical drama film directed by Luigi Zampa and starring Fosco Giachetti. It is based on the play The Cardinal by Louis N. Parker.

Cast
 Fosco Giachetti as Il cardinale Giovanni de Medici
 Jacqueline Laurent as Berta Chigi
 Enzo Fiermonte as Giuliano de Medici
 Carlo Tamberlani as Andrea Strozzi
 Aldo Silvani as Bartolomeo Chigi
 Domenico Viglione Borghese as Il governatore Baglioni
 Manoel Roero as Raffaello (as Manuel Roero)
 Fausto Guerzoni as Beppe, il campanaro
 Evelina Paoli as Madonna de Medici
 Peppino Spadaro as Luigi
 Renato Chiantoni as Bernardino
 Emilio Petacci as Un mercante della statua di Venere
 Franco Pesce as Un invitato alla festa

Production
L'abito nero da sposa is based on the play The Cardinal by Louis N. Parker. The film had some notoriety in Italy as it was blacklisted by the church. The film was originally going to be the directorial debut of Mario Pannunzio, who dropped out of the project. Luigi Zampa, who was in the army and about to leave to the Russian front, was given a 60 day permit to direct the film. During principal shooting on the film, on September 8, 1943 General Pietro Badoglio signed an armistice and joined the allies as co-belligerent. Film was put on hold until the American forces were in Italy, and filming continued in June 1944.

Release
L'abito nero da sposa was distributed by Produttori Associatti in Italy on May 17, 1945. Zampa later spoke on about his early films, stating that he "prefer not to remember [them]. They taught me how to move the camera and direct the actors. But I never tried to watch them again, there is nothing inside them. They were just spectacles."

References

Bibliography

External links

1945 films
1940s historical drama films
Italian historical drama films
1940s Italian-language films
Italian black-and-white films
Films set in Florence
Films set in the 16th century
Films directed by Luigi Zampa
1945 drama films
1940s Italian films